Ottumwa Cemetery is a public cemetery located in Ottumwa, Iowa, United States. The entrance area of the cemetery forms a historic district that was listed on the National Register of Historic Places in 1995. At the time of its nomination it was composed of four resources, which included two contributing buildings and two contributing structures.

History
The cemetery was established in 1857 when the community outgrew the old cemetery, which was located closer to the downtown area. The lots were laid in a grid pattern with meandering roads along the hillsides. It forms an arboretum that contains trees and shrubs that have been planted throughout the city's history. It was listed on the National Register of Historic Places in 1995 as a part of the Ottumwa MPS.

Architecture
An ornate receiving vault was built in the cemetery in 1887. It is composed of red brick with terra cotta panels. It was designed in the Gothic Revival style. A wrought iron fence was put up along Court Street just after the vault was built. The Edgerly Gateway provides the main entrance into the cemetery. The limestone arch was built in the classical style of a Triumphal Roman arch in 1904. Two years later the combination office and chapel building was built in the Gothic Revival style. It was dedicated to the Union soldiers and sailors who fought in the American Civil War. The building features arched windows and crenelated roofline.

Notable burials
Leonidas M. Godley (1836–1904), Medal of Honor recipient from the Civil War
Herschel C. Loveless (1911–1989), Governor of Iowa 
Thomas J. Potter (1840–1888), railroad executive of Union Pacific Railroad
Daniel F. Steck (1881–1950), U.S. Senator from Iowa
One British Commonwealth war grave, of a World War I Royal Flying Corps Cadet.

References

Historic districts on the National Register of Historic Places in Iowa
Historic districts in Wapello County, Iowa
National Register of Historic Places in Wapello County, Iowa
Cemeteries on the National Register of Historic Places in Iowa
Cemeteries in Iowa
Protected areas of Wapello County, Iowa
Gothic Revival architecture in Iowa
1857 establishments in Iowa
Buildings and structures in Ottumwa, Iowa